The 1993 Hădăreni riots were a series of riots in the village of Hădăreni, Mureș County, Romania, involving Romanians and Hungarians on the one side against Roma on the other side, ending with three (or four, according to some sources) Roma being murdered.

The riots
On 20 September 1993, a group of Roma had an argument with an elderly Romanian. When his son arrived to rescue the father, one of the Roma stabbed the younger Romanian to death. The Roma then sought refuge in a house where they locked themselves in. The Romanians demanded they leave the house and render themselves to police. As the Roma refused to come out of the house, the Romanian and Hungarian villagers, including the local police commander and one of his officers, gathered outside, sprayed the house with gasoline and set it on fire. Two Roma were lynched when they tried to flee, one burned to death inside, and one escaped. There had been dozens of complaints about thefts committed by Roma from the majority population in the previous period which were never solved by police.

Afterwards, in a "classic case of mob justice", 13 (or 14, according to some sources) Roma houses were burnt down, and an additional four were damaged. The police did nothing to stop the attacks. Most of the 130 Roma inhabitants of the village fled into the nearby woods, returning only after days or even weeks.

The government, in its official explanation, expressed understanding for the "anger of the villagers."

The trial
After charges were filed in 1997, five men were convicted by a Romanian court of murder, and seven of property destruction and disturbing public order. In 1999, the Romanian Supreme Court acquitted two of the accused murderers and reduced the charges against the other three.

The European Court of Human Rights decided that the Romanians have to pay €238,000 compensation to the group of Roma whose houses were burnt down. According to the European Court verdict, representatives of the Romanian Police participated in the arson, and then tried to hide this. The court also decided that the ethnic origin of the people involved was an important factor in its outcome, and that the length of the trial (11 years) infringed on their right to a fair trial.

See also
 Roma in Romania
 2006 Ferentari riot

References

External links 
 Haller, István: Lynching is not a crime: mob violence against Roma in post-Ceaușescu Romania , Roma Rights, Spring/1998 (ISSN 1417-1503), ERRC, Budapest, p. 35-42.
 Haller, István: Cazul Hădăreni, Altera, nr. 7/1998 (ISSN 1224-0338), Editura Pro Europa, Tîrgu-Mureș, p. 106-123.
 Haller, István: Procesul Hădăreni, Altera, nr. 28/2005 (ISSN 1224-0338), Editura Pro Europa, Tîrgu-Mureș, p. 63-92.

1993 in Romania
1993 riots
Riots and civil disorder in Romania
Antiziganism in Romania
Ethnic riots
Mureș County
Romani-related controversies
Romani history in Romania